Gonocephalus klossi, Kloss's forest dragon, is a species of agamid lizard. It is found in Indonesia.

References

Gonocephalus
Reptiles of Indonesia
Reptiles described in 1920
Taxa named by George Albert Boulenger
Fauna of Sumatra